Vouliagmenis Avenue is one of the longest avenues in the Greater Athens area, stretching from central Athens to the seaside resort of Vouliagmeni.  The total length is 21 km.  The avenue begins at Athanasios Diakos Street and Michalakopoulou Street and the southbound portion of the avenue runs with three lanes to the southern portion of municipality of Athens and eastern Dafni. Seven Athens Metro subway stations lie underneath or next to the avenue: Agios Ioannis, Dafni, Agios Dimitrios, Ilioupoli station, Alimos station, Argyroupoli station and Elliniko station, all part of the southern section of the Red Line. It has an intersection with the road linking with the Hymettus Ring of the Attiki Odos motorway and Katechaki Avenue. It also has several intersections in Glyfada and with the Vari-Koropi Avenue.

Places
southern Athens (Municipality)
eastern Dafni
Agios Dimitrios
near Ilioupoli
eastern Alimos
Elliniko
Glyfada
Voula
Vouliagmeni

Attractions
Nana Cinemax
Athens Metro Mall

Major intersections
Alimos Avenue

Streets in Athens
Elliniko-Argyroupoli
Glyfada